3PL may refer to:

Third-party logistics, a concept in logistics
the Three parameter logistic model in item response theory
a glossing abbreviation meaning "third person, plural number"